Neoregelia marmorata is a species of flowering plant in the family Bromeliaceae. It is endemic to Brazil.

Cultivars

 Neoregelia 'Alex D. Hawkes'
 Neoregelia 'Atrata'
 Neoregelia 'Beelzebub'
 Neoregelia 'Big Brother'
 Neoregelia 'Bliss'
 Neoregelia 'Charm'
 Neoregelia 'Charmian'
 Neoregelia 'Dad's Special'
 Neoregelia 'Dark Glory'
 Neoregelia 'Dazzle'
 Neoregelia 'Forest Drive'
 Neoregelia 'Freckle Face'
 Neoregelia 'Hal Ellis'
 Neoregelia 'Julian Nally'
 Neoregelia 'Kin-Naree'
 Neoregelia 'Krasny'
 Neoregelia 'Little Cherub'
 Neoregelia 'Madrid'
 Neoregelia 'Manoa Beauty'
 Neoregelia 'Marcon'
 Neoregelia 'Marilu Freckles'
 Neoregelia 'Memoriam'
 Neoregelia 'Mini Misso'
 Neoregelia 'Mottles'
 Neoregelia 'Nez Misso'
 Neoregelia 'Red Clown'
 Neoregelia 'Red Dot'
 Neoregelia 'Red Variety'
 Neoregelia 'Robust'
 Neoregelia 'Rose Mist'
 Neoregelia 'Royal Colour'
 Neoregelia 'Royal Purple'
 Neoregelia 'Royal Red'
 Neoregelia 'Spotted Dick'
 Neoregelia 'Stepping Out'
 Neoregelia 'Stormy Forest'
 Neoregelia 'Stormy Forest Too'
 Neoregelia 'Sun Red'
 Neoregelia 'Suntan'
 Neoregelia 'Sweetie Pie'
 Neoregelia 'Thelma's Choice'
 × Neomea 'Arla Rutledge'
 × Neomea 'San Diego'
 × Neophytum 'Mollie S.'

References

BSI Cultivar Registry Retrieved 11 October 2009

marmorata
Flora of Brazil
Taxa named by Lyman Bradford Smith
Taxa named by John Gilbert Baker